Papyrus 47 (P. Chester Beatty III), designated by siglum  (in the Gregory-Aland numbering of New Testament manuscripts), is an early Greek New Testament manuscript written on papyrus, and is one of the manuscripts comprising the Chester Beatty Papyri. Manuscripts among the Chester Beatty Papyri have had several places of discovery associated with them, the most likely being the Faiyum. Using the study of comparative writing styles (palaeography), it has been dated to the early 3rd century CE. The codex contains text from the Book of Revelation chapters 9 through 17. It is currently housed at the Chester Beatty Library (Inv. 14. 1. 527) in Dublin.

Text

As the manuscript is quite fragmented, it contains the text of Revelation 9:10-11:3; 11:5-16:15; and 16:17-17:2. The Greek text of this codex is considered a representative of the Alexandrian text-type (the text-types are groups of different manuscripts which share specific or generally related readings, which then differ from each other group, and thus the conflicting readings can separate out the groups, which are then used to determine the original text as published; there are three main groups with names: Alexandrian, Western, and Byzantine). Biblical scholar Kurt Aland ascribed it as a Normal text, and placed it in Category I. 

The text of this manuscript is closest to Codex Sinaiticus, and they are witnesses for one of the early textual types of the Book of Revelation. Another type is represented by the manuscripts Papyrus 115, Codex Alexandrinus (A), and Codex Ephraemi (C). The text in - is considered to be an inferior witness to the text of Revelation as opposed to that of -A-C.

See also 

 List of New Testament papyri

References

Further reading 

 
 
 
 

New Testament papyri
3rd-century biblical manuscripts
Early Greek manuscripts of the New Testament
Manuscripts in the Chester Beatty Library
Book of Revelation papyri